Idris Khan OBE (born 1978) is a British artist based in London.

Khan's work draws from a diverse range of cultural sources including literature, history, art, music and religion to create densely layered imagery that is both abstract and figurative and addresses narratives of history, cumulative experience and the metaphysical collapse of time into single moments.

Early life and education
Khan is a Muslim by origin. His father is from Pakistan. His mother converted to Islam after meeting his father.

Khan graduated in photography from the University of Derby in 2001, he studied for an MA at the Royal College of Art in 2004.

Career
Khan's photographs or scans originate from secondary source material – for instance, every page of the Qur'an, every Beethoven sonata, every William Turner postcard from Tate Britain, or every Bernd and Hilla Becher spherical gasholder. Khan's interest in Islam and layered imagery can be traced back to his upbringing: It was his father's idea that Khan – himself a non-practicing Muslim – photograph every page of the Qur'an. His work and process have been described as "experiments in compressed memories" and "all-encompassing composites." As Khan describes: "It is a challenge to not define my work as a photograph but using the medium of photography to create something that exists on the surface of the paper and not to be transported back to an isolated moment in time."

Khan's visual layering also occurs in his videos, such as Last Three Piano Sonatas…after Franz Schubert, a three-channel video installation wherein he uses multiple camera angles to capture numerous performances of Schubert's last sonatas, composed on his deathbed.

In 2012, Khan was commissioned by the British Museum in London to create a new wall drawing for the exhibition, Hajj: Journey to the Heart of Islam. In addition to the wall drawing, a sculpture was installed in the museum's Great Court. Also in 2012, The New York Times Magazine commissioned Khan to create a new body of work that was published in their London issue, focusing on iconic sites.

In 2016, Khan was commissioned to build a  memorial to the war dead of the United Arab Emirates. The sculpture is constructed from seven aluminium-encased steel tablets, cast with poems by emirs of the UAE.

Recognition
Khan was appointed Officer of the Order of the British Empire (OBE) in the 2017 Birthday Honours for services to art.

Personal life
Khan works from a studio in Stoke Newington, London he shares with his wife, the British artist Annie Morris. They have two children and a cockapoo called Pencil.

Selected exhibitions
 Still Revolution: Suspended in Time, Museum of Contemporary Canadian Art, Toronto, May–June 2009. Group exhibition with Khan, Barbara Astman, Walead Beshty, Mat Collishaw, Stan Douglas, Trevor Paglen, Martha Rosler, and Mikhael Subotzky.
 K20 in Düsseldorf, Germany. Solo exhibition.
 Göteborgs Konsthall, Sweden. Solo exhibition.
 Taidehalli in Helsinki
 Photographic Dialogues between Past, Present and Future, Musée de l'Élysée, Switzerland, 2016. Group exhibition.
 Conflicting Lines, Victoria Miro Gallery, London, 2015. Solo exhibition.
 Saatchi Gallery in London

Collections
Khan's work is held in the following permanent collections:
 Saatchi Collection, London
 San Francisco Museum of Modern Art, San Francisco, CA
 Solomon R. Guggenheim Museum, New York
 Tel Aviv Museum of Art, Israel
 Art Gallery of New South Wales, Sydney
 Philadelphia Museum of Art, Philadelphia, PA
 de young, San Francisco, CA
 Centre Georges Pompidou, Paris

References

External links
 Idris Khan at Sean Kelly Gallery
Idris Khan at Victoria Miro Gallery
 Idris Khan at Thomas Schulte
 Idris Khan on ArtFacts.net
 Idris Khan – Photography – Saatchi Gallery
 Yvon Lambert – Idris Khan

1978 births
Living people
Alumni of the University of Derby
Alumni of the Royal College of Art
British contemporary artists
British artists of Pakistani descent
Officers of the Order of the British Empire
English male sculptors
21st-century sculptors
Sculptors from London
Photographers from Birmingham, West Midlands